Trimble is a town in Dyer and Obion counties in the U.S. state of Tennessee. The population was 637 at the 2010 census.

The Dyer County portion of Trimble is part of the Dyersburg, TN Micropolitan Statistical Area, while the Obion County portion is part of the Union City, TN–KY Micropolitan Statistical Area.

Geography
According to the United States Census Bureau, the town has a total area of 0.6 square mile (1.7 km), all land.

Demographics

As of the census of 2000, there were 728 people, 307 households, and 209 families residing in the town. The racial makeup of the town was 98.21% White, 0.69% African American, 0.41% from other races, and 0.69% from two or more races. Hispanic or Latino of any race were 0.96% of the population.

There were 307 households, out of which 28.7% had children under the age of 18 living with them, 54.1% were married couples living together, 8.8% had a female householder with no husband present, and 31.9% were non-families. 28.0% of all households were made up of individuals, and 14.7% had someone living alone who was 65 years of age or older. The average household size was 2.37 and the average family size was 2.89.

In the town, the population was spread out, with 22.9% under the age of 18, 9.5% from 18 to 24, 26.4% from 25 to 44, 25.0% from 45 to 64, and 16.2% who were 65 years of age or older. The median age was 40 years. For every 100 females, there were 93.1 males. For every 100 females age 18 and over, there were 90.2 males.

The median income for a household in the town was $33,000, and the median income for a family was $38,750. Males had a median income of $35,208 versus $19,125 for females. The per capita income for the town was $15,991. About 7.2% of families and 11.4% of the population were below the poverty line, including 7.4% of those under age 18 and 22.1% of those age 65 or over.

Parks and recreation
The town features a gazebo and covered bridge that is often used for weddings.

Education
Trimble Elementary School

References

External links
Town of Trimble official website

Towns in Dyer County, Tennessee
Towns in Obion County, Tennessee
Towns in Tennessee
Union City, Tennessee micropolitan area
1905 establishments in Tennessee